Lobocolpodes is a genus of ground beetles in the family Carabidae. There are about six described species in Lobocolpodes, found in Madagascar.

Species
These six species belong to the genus Lobocolpodes:
 Lobocolpodes australis (Jeannel, 1955)
 Lobocolpodes cuprescens (Jeannel, 1949)
 Lobocolpodes murex (Alluaud, 1909)
 Lobocolpodes pachys (Jeannel, 1951)
 Lobocolpodes phenax (Alluaud, 1932)
 Lobocolpodes ranomandryae Basilewsky, 1985

References

Platyninae